René Lobello (5 May 1963) is a French football manager and former player. He was most recently manager of Championnat National side Tours FC.

Biography
Lobello was born in Chambéry. After his playing career, he became a coach in several countries, in Middle East, in North Africa but also in Switzerland.

Back in France, he worked in Metz and Sochaux before following Francis Gillot in Bordeaux and Shanghai.

He became assistant of coach Christophe Galtier, who wanted to expand his staff at AS Saint-Étienne in June 2016, he left the club a year later following the departure of the French coach.

He joined Chinese Super League club Liaoning Hongyun Football Club in August 2017. After a last place in the ranking, he is thanked in September 2017 after only seven league games.

Lobello was appointed manager of newly-relegated Championnat National side Tours FC in June 2018. He left the club in December 2018.

Playing career 
 1968–1978: USAM Toulon
 1978–1980: FC Mulhouse
 1980–1981: Paris SG
 1981–1982: Montceau-les-Mines
 1982–1983: La Seyne-sur-Mer
 1983–1984: FC Mulhouse
 1984–1986: Carpentras
 1986–1989: AS Porto Vecchio

Coaching career 
 1989–1996: French Football Federation Regional Technical Adviser of Var (France)
 1996–1997: Al Shabab Riyad (Saudi Arabia) (assistant coach)
 1997: Al Wahda La Mecque (Saudi Arabia) (assistant coach)
 1998: Al Nasr Riyad (Saudi Arabia) (assistant coach)
 1998–1999: Étoile Sportive du Sahel (Tunisia) (assistant coach)
 1999–2002: FC Sochaux (France) (assistant coach of Jean Fernandez)
 2002–2003: FC Metz (France) (assistant coach of Jean Fernandez)
 2003 – Jan 2004: Étoile Sportive du Sahel (Tunisia) (Coach)
 Feb 2004–2005: Neuchâtel Xamax (Switzerland) (Coach – general manager)
 2005–2006: Young Boys Berne (Switzerland) (assistant coach of Gernot Rohr)
 2006–2007: USM Alger (Algeria) (Coach)
 Jan 2008–2011: FC Sochaux (France) (Assistant Coach Francis Gillot)
 2011–2015: Girondins de Bordeaux (France) (Assistant Coach Francis Gillot)
 2015–2016: Shanghai Greenland (China) (Assistant Coach Francis Gillot)
 2016–2017: AS Saint-Étienne (France) (Assistant Coach Christophe Galtier)
 August 2017 – September 2017: Liaoning FC (China)
 2018: Tours FC (France)

Honors 
 French Champion of French Ligue 2 in 2001 D2 with Sochaux
 Winner of the African Cup Winners' Cup in 2003 with Étoile sportive du Sahel
 Winner of the Asian Cup Winners' Cup in 1998 with Al Nasr Riyad
 Winner of the French Cup in 2013 with Bordeaux

References 

 Interview of René Lobello
 René Lobello and Francis Gillot signed in Shanghai
 Article about René Lobello
 René Lobello signs for Two years-deal in ASSE

External links 
 

1963 births
Living people
French footballers
Association football midfielders
French football managers
French expatriate football managers
FC Metz non-playing staff
Étoile Sportive du Sahel managers
Neuchâtel Xamax FCS managers
BSC Young Boys non-playing staff
Tours FC managers
Shanghai Shenhua F.C. non-playing staff
French expatriate sportspeople in Saudi Arabia
Expatriate football managers in Tunisia
French expatriate sportspeople in Tunisia
Expatriate football managers in China
French expatriate sportspeople in China
Expatriate football managers in Switzerland
French expatriate sportspeople in Switzerland
Sportspeople from Chambéry